Dolgoma rectoides is a moth of the family Erebidae. It was described by Vladimir Viktorovitch Dubatolov in 2012 and is endemic to Vietnam.

References

External links

Moths described in 2012
Endemic fauna of Vietnam
rectoides